Strongylopus merumontanus is a species of frog in the family Pyxicephalidae. It is found on Mount Meru in Tanzania, and according to some sources, the Nyika Plateau and Shire Highlands of Malawi. Common name Mt. Meru stream frog has been coined for it.

It is associated with streams in both upper montane forest and afro-alpine heath land However, juveniles may venture in the forest, far from streams. It is locally abundant on Mount Meru where its range is protected by the Arusha National Park.

References

merumontanus
Frogs of Africa
Amphibians of Malawi
Amphibians of Tanzania
Amphibians described in 1910
Taxa named by Einar Lönnberg
Taxonomy articles created by Polbot